The WWL Goddess Championship  is a women's professional wrestling championship promoted by the World Wrestling League (WWL) promotion in Puerto Rico, basically is the women's championship of World Wrestling League.

The championship is generally contested in professional wrestling matches, in which participants execute scripted finishes rather than contend in direct competition.

Title history

References 

Women's professional wrestling championships
World Wrestling League Championships